In marketing and the social sciences, observational research (or field research) is a social research technique that involves the direct observation of phenomena in their natural setting. This differentiates it from experimental research in which a quasi-artificial environment is created to control for spurious factors, and where at least one of the variables is manipulated as part of the experilovement.

In context
Observational research is a method of data  collection that has become associated with qualitative research.  Compared with quantitative research and experimental research, observational research tends to be less reliable but often more valid. The main advantage of observational research is flexibility. The researchers can change their approach as needed.  Observational research measures behavior directly, rather than the subject's self-reports of behavior or intentions. The main disadvantage is it is limited to behavioral variables. It cannot be used to study cognitive or affective variables.

Data collection methods
Generally, there are three methods used to collect data in observational research:
Covert observational research – The researchers do not identify themselves. Either they mix in with the subjects undetected, or they observe from a distance. The advantages of this approach are: (1) It is not necessary to get the subjects' cooperation, and (2) The subjects' behaviour will not be contaminated by the presence of the researcher.  Some researchers have ethical misgivings with the deceit involved in this approach.
Overt observational research – The researchers identify themselves as researchers and explain the purpose of their observations. The problem with this approach is subjects may modify their behaviour when they know they are being watched. They portray their "ideal self" rather than their true self in what is called the Hawthorne Effect. The advantage that the overt approach has over the covert approach is that there is no deception (see, for example,  PCIA-II
Participant Observation – The researcher participates in what they are observing so as to get a finer appreciation of the phenomena.

In marketing research
In marketing research, the most frequently used types of observational techniques are:
Personal observation
observing products in use to detect usage patterns and problems
observing license plates in store parking lots
determining the socio-economic status of shoppers
determining the level of package scrutiny
determining the time it takes to make a purchase decision
Mechanical observation
eye-tracking analysis while subjects watch advertisements
oculometers – what the subject is looking at
pupilometers – how interested is the viewer
electronic checkout scanners – records purchase behaviour  
on-site cameras in stores
 people meters (as in monitoring television viewing) e.g.Nielsen box 
voice pitch meters – measures emotional reactions
psychogalvanometer – measures galvanic skin response
Audits
retail audits to determine the quality of service in stores
inventory audits to determine product acceptance
shelf space audits
scanner based audits 
Trace Analysis
credit card records
computer cookie records
garbology – looking for traces of purchase patterns in garbage
detecting store traffic patterns by observing the wear in the floor (long term) or the dirt on the floor (short term)
exposure to advertisements
Content analysis
observe the content of magazines, television broadcasts, radio broadcasts, or newspapers, either articles, programs, or advertisements

See also

References

Further reading

 Russell W. Belk (ed), Handbook of Qualitative Research Methods in Marketing, Edward Elgar Publishing, 2006
 Constance T. Fischer (ed), Qualitative Research Methods for Psychologists, Elsevier, 2006

Market research
Marketing techniques
Qualitative research